Makhgalyn Bayarjavkhlan (born 18 June 1978 in Nömreg sum, Zavkhan aimag) is a Mongolian judoka who competed in the super heavyweight division (+100 kg). He was also the nation's flag bearer at the opening ceremony in the 2008 Summer Olympics. Before the Games started, Makhgal competed at the 2008 Asian Judo Championships, where he placed seventh in the super heavyweight division.

During the competition, Makhgal lost in the first round of the men's super heavyweight division, after Janusz Wojnarowicz (Poland) scored an ippon (a full one point) within a time of 24 seconds.

References

External links
 
 NBC Olympic Profile

1978 births
Living people
People from Zavkhan Province
Mongolian male judoka
Olympic judoka of Mongolia
Judoka at the 2008 Summer Olympics
Judoka at the 2002 Asian Games
Asian Games competitors for Mongolia